William Dole (died 1403) was a Canon of Windsor from 1377 to 1403.

Career
He was appointed:
Vicar of Exning, Suffolk 1371
Vicar of Maresfield, Sussex
Vicar of Croydon, Surrey 1371

He was appointed to the first stall in St George's Chapel, Windsor Castle in 1377 and held the canonry until 1403.

Notes 

1403 deaths
Canons of Windsor
Year of birth unknown